Mi Jardin Azul: Las Canciones Favoritas (English translation: "My Blue Garden: The Favorite Songs") is a compilation album by American singer/songwriter/producer Linda Ronstadt, released in 2004.

The tracks were compiled from Ronstadt's previous Spanish-language albums Canciones De Mi Padre, Mas Canciones, and Frenesi (all of which were Grammy Award winners), as well as "Lo Siento Mi Vida" from Hasten Down the Wind and "Adonde Voy" from Winter Light.
Wardrobe Stylist Genny Schorr
Photo by Jim Britt 
This album is currently out of print in the United States.

Reception

Music critic Thom Jurek praised the compilation in his Allmusic review, writing: "Its remastered sound, personal notes, and photographs that annotate the selections make for a fine travelogue through this aspect of the singer's long career... these titles are all among the most interesting and compelling in her catalog. There is no hint of revisionism or novelty in their presentation or articulation. Musically, this set is gorgeous: full of life and passion, and brimming with stunning moments in both the vocal performances and arrangements. Wonderful."

Track listing

References

2004 compilation albums
Linda Ronstadt compilation albums
Rhino Records compilation albums
Spanish-language compilation albums